Vikki Dougan (born Edith Tooker, January 1, 1929) is an American former model and actress.

Early Years

Dougan was born in Brooklyn. Her mother was a librarian and her father was an insurance salesman. Her father left the family when Dougan was 6 months old.

Dougan began modeling at age eleven. She had a successful career in modeling before gaining her first movie role in Back from Eternity as an uncredited showgirl. She gained small parts in another nine movies.

Dougan won multiple beauty pageants, including the Miss Coney Island pageant and the eighth annual New York Skate Queen contest. She began modeling as a teenager, changing her name to Vikki after the actress Vickie Lester and Dougan after her mother’s maiden name.

Career

In 1956, publicity-man Milton Weiss had the idea of promoting Vikki using a backless dress to garner publicity. The idea was to gain a contrast with the fashion for models and actresses with large bosoms, such as Jayne Mansfield.

In 1953, photographer Ralph Crane photographed Dougan for Life magazine, and their October 26 edition featured Dougan on the cover.

In June 1957, Dougan appeared in the (Vol. 4, Issue 6) edition of Playboy magazine. Dougan featured again in the December 1962 issue, under the section "Playboy's Other Girlfriends".

In 1960, Dougan married Jim R. Sweeney, an ex-football player from Texas Christian University. The marriage was short lived. 

In 1961, her backless dresses and "callipygian cleft" were celebrated in the song "Vikki Dougan" by The Limeliters in their album The Slightly Fabulous Limeliters.

In January 1964, Cavalier magazine featured twelve nude photographs of Vikki Dougan in a pictorial entitled "The Back is Back". Dougan brought a lawsuit against the magazine, stating that the magazine did not have permission to publish them. The photographs had been posed for Playboy but Dougan had subsequently declined to let Playboy publish the photographs.

Personal Life

Throughout the 1950s and 1960s, she dated a string of prominent Hollywood men, including Frank Sinatra and Glenn Ford. She was lifelong friends with Sandra Giles and Gloria Pall.

She lives in Beverly Hills, California. She regularly attends the Los Angeles Jewish Film Festival and recently did interviews with Hollywood Exclusive, The New York Times, and Classic Images.

See also 
List of people in Playboy 1953-1959

References

External links 
  
 Vikki Dougan at Glamour Girls of the Silver Screen 
 Kitch-slapped "Looking back at Vikki 'the back' Dougan - A biography" 

1929 births
Glamour models
Living people
1950s Playboy Playmates